Irving Melrose "Young Cy" Young (July 21, 1877 – January 14, 1935) was a professional baseball pitcher. He played six seasons in Major League Baseball from 1905 to 1911 for the Boston Beaneaters/Doves, Pittsburgh Pirates, and Chicago White Sox.

Young is one of only two pitchers in modern (post–1900) baseball history to win 20 games for a team that lost 100 games, going 20–21 for the 51–103 Beaneaters of 1905. (The other pitcher to do it was Ned Garver for the 1951 St. Louis Browns, who went 20-12).

References

External links

Major League Baseball pitchers
Boston Beaneaters players
Boston Doves players
Pittsburgh Pirates players
Chicago White Sox players
Sacramento Senators players
Seattle Siwashes players
Concord Marines players
Minneapolis Millers (baseball) players
Milwaukee Brewers (minor league) players
Baseball players from Maine
People from Washington County, Maine
People from Brewer, Maine
1877 births
1935 deaths